Feriz Nuk (also Romanized as Ferīz Nūk, Ferīznūk, Fīrīznuk, and Fīrūznok) is a village in Baqeran Rural District, in the Central District of Birjand County, South Khorasan Province, Iran. As of the 2006 census, its population was 65, in 15 families.

References 

Populated places in Birjand County